The Mid Kent & North Kent Junction Railway (usually referred to as the Mid Kent Railway) was an early railway in Kent England. (Note the name is given both with and without the hyphen in different sources.)

History

Origins
The Mid Kent Railway was formed on 23 July 1855 to construct a 4.75-mile line between the South Eastern Railway (SER) at Lewisham and the Farnborough Extension of the West End of London and Crystal Palace Railway (WEL&CPR) at Beckenham, later renamed Beckenham Junction. The intention then was to extend this line to Croydon at a later date. The line opened 1 January 1857 and was operated by the SER under a ten-year agreement.

Addiscombe Line
Although the company later abandoned its intention of building a line to Croydon, an extension to "Croydon (Addiscombe Road)" from  through  was completed in 1862 which was also leased to the SER on completion.

Dissolution
The remaining interests of the company were taken over by the SER in August 1866.

The Crays Company
The MK(B&SMC)R was commonly called The Crays Company.

It was assumed that the Crays line would be operated by the SER in conjunction with the Lewisham to Beckenham line, and eventually acquired by them.  But the shareholders heard that the SER was planning a competing line and transferred their allegiance to the East Kent Railway (EKR).  After negotiation with the EKR, the Crays Company only built the line from the WEL&CPR at Bromley to "Southborough Road".  St Mary Cray to Southborough Road was built by the EKR as part of their Western Extension from Strood.

The Crays line was leased to the London, Chatham & Dover Railway (LC&DR, successor to the EKR) in 1862.

Thus despite the similarity of name, the Mid Kent and North Kent Junction Railway and the Mid-Kent (Bromley & St Mary Cray) Railway remained separate and independent until absorbed by the SER and LC&DR respectively.

Legacy
The Lewisham – Elmers End and the Shortlands – St Mary Cray sections now form parts of the Hayes line and the Chatham Main Line, respectively.

References

Early British railway companies
Railway companies established in 1855
Railway lines opened in 1857
Railway companies disestablished in 1866
1855 establishments in England
British companies established in 1855